Antonakis Andreou (Greek: Αντωνάκης Ανδρεου) often called Antonis Andreou, is a Cypriot sport shooter. He has represented Cyprus in the 1996 Summer Olympics ranking 9th and the 2000 Summer Olympics ranking 8th. He represented Cyprus at the 2012 Summer Olympics in London, finishing in 22nd.

He won a gold medal for Cyprus at the 1994 Commonwealth Games in Skeet pairs.

He was the flag bearer for Cyprus at the 2000 Summer Olympics in Sydney.

In 2011 he equaled the world record and claimed the gold medal at the ISSF Shotgun World Cup in Beijing, China.

Records

External links
 Official profile on ISSF

References

Skeet shooters
Shooters at the 1996 Summer Olympics
Shooters at the 2000 Summer Olympics
Shooters at the 2012 Summer Olympics
Cypriot male sport shooters
Olympic shooters of Cyprus
People from Paralimni
1974 births
Living people
Shooters at the 1994 Commonwealth Games
Commonwealth Games gold medallists for Cyprus
Commonwealth Games medallists in shooting
Medallists at the 1994 Commonwealth Games